São Luís or São Luiz (Portuguese language for Saint Louis) may refer to several places in the Portuguese-speaking world:

Brazil
São Luís, Maranhão. Capital of Maranhão.
São Luís de Montes Belos. Municipality of Goiás.
São Luiz do Paraitinga. Municipality of São Paulo.
São Luiz, Roraima. Municipality of Roraima state.
São Luiz Gonzaga. Municipality of Rio Grande do Sul state.
São Luiz, São José Neighborhood of São José, Santa Catarina
Jardim São Luiz. Neighborhood and district of São Paulo
São Luís do Quitunde
São Luís do Curu
São Luís Gonzaga do Maranhão
São Luís do Piauí
São Luís do Paraitinga

Portugal
São Luís (Portugal), a parish in the municipality of Odemira in Beja

Rivers
Rio São Luiz, a river in Acre, Brazil

See also
List of cities in Brazil
San Luis (disambiguation)